Derek Henry Carr (1 September 1927 – 6 July 2004) was an English footballer who played in the Football League for Birmingham City. Carr, a utility player, joined Birmingham City from Lockheed Leamington in December 1947, and made his debut in the First Division on 22 October 1949 in a goalless draw away at Everton. He played twice more in the 1949–50 season, and also worked in the offices at St Andrew's, before moving into non-league football with Rugby Town, Evesham United and Boldmere St. Michaels.

Carr was born in Blidworth, near Mansfield, Nottinghamshire, and died in Birmingham.

References

1927 births
2004 deaths
People from Blidworth
Footballers from Nottinghamshire
English footballers
Association football utility players
Leamington F.C. players
Birmingham City F.C. players
Rugby Town F.C. (1945) players
Evesham United F.C. players
Boldmere St. Michaels F.C. players
English Football League players
Association football midfielders